Formula Boats is a brand of pleasure boats produced in the United States and sold globally. Thunderbird Products owns and operates the Formula brand.

History

Three separate events came together to create the present-day Formula Boats.

Thunderbird
In 1956, John "Woody" Woodson began experimenting with fiberglass technology to create 14- and 16-foot runabout boats called the Thunderbird with Richard C. Cole as his principal designer. Cole pioneered the use of the Cathedral hull, making the first successful sterndrive crossing from Miami to Nassau in a Thunderbird in 1959.

In 1961, Merrick Lewis bought Thunderbird. Merrick Lewis did not know much about boats, so he hired Richard "Dick" Genth as a salesman. Dick and Merrick believed the best way to promote Thunderbird was to participate in the new sport of offshore racing. Dick began racing and earned a name for himself and Thunderbird boats.

In 1964, Alliance Machine purchased Thunderbird and changed the name to Thunderbird/Formula, hoping this addition to their offshore racing team would also be successful. The racing scene soon proved expensive, and Fuqua Industries bought Thunderbird/Formula in 1969.

Thunderbird is best remembered today as providing the boat used in the 60s television show Flipper, a 23' Thunderbird Iroquois.

Formula Marine
A competitive and athletic World War 2 merchant marine veteran, powerboat racer Don Aronow would found the first of several boat companies on NE 188th Street in North Miami Beach, Formula Marine, in 1963.

Racing his first Miami-Nassau race in 1962, Aronow was instantly hooked on powerboat racing, and saw a winning formula with partners Dave Stirrat, Jim Wynne, Walt Walters, Buddy Smith, and Jake Trotter, naming his company Formula after this partnership.

The original 233 deep-V hull design was the first successful model, and its influence is present in today's models.

Aronow would sell Formula and all but one of his molds to Alliance Machine Company in 1964 in what would become a pattern, where upon he would sign a non-compete clause, walk out the door and start Donzi Marine right next door.

Vic Porter
Vic Porter was an entrepreneur who experienced great success in mobile home sales, real estate and boat sales. After a few years as a salesman, Porter believed he could build better models of boats than he was currently selling.

In 1958, Vic Porter founded Duo Incorporated and started his career as a boat builder with his first 14-foot twin outboard-powered catamaran. Porter's boats became popular, and in 1963 Duo Incorporated was crafting 20 boats per week. In 1966, his sales revenue was over one million dollars.

After much success, Vic Porter sold Duo Incorporated to Bangor Punta in 1967. In 1970, Porter stepped away from his role as President of Duo Incorporated to begin Signa Corporation in Decatur, Indiana. Signa Corporation began producing sterndrive and outboard powered tri-hull runabouts. Thanks to Porter's reputation, Signa quickly became successful as it marketed boats in the Midwest and East.

Signa's success attracted the attention of Fuqua Industries, which owned Thunderbird/Formula. Fuqua industries purchased Signa in 1973, and Vic Porter became the president of Thunderbird/Formula/Signa.

After a few years as President of both companies, Vic Porter started Porter Inc. and purchased Thunderbird/Formula/Signa. Then in 1979, the company canceled the Signa lineup, and the brand became Thunderbird/Formula. Porter developed the Formula deep-V series of cuddies and the Formula 302 LS high-performance offshore model during this same year. The Formula name continued to grow in popularity among the boating community due to many innovative designs.

Formula Boats
In 1980, Formula introduced integrated, continuous fiberglass cockpits to their boats, improving the structure and design. Formula began to useImron paint for the hull graphics for long-lasting colors and designs in 1982. Formula Boats introduced the curved glass windshield to their boats in 1984, and in 1988 Vic's son Scott Porter became President of Formula Boats while Vic Porter retained his role as chairman of the board.

Due to increased interest in family day boating, Formula created the Sun Sport line in 1990. However, performance continued to be vital to the Formula brand, and the FAS3TECH series arrived in 1997. As Formula entered the new century, the factory expanded and began producing the Super Sport series. In 2006, Scott Porter's brother Ted developed an interest in hydroplane racing and Formula sponsored his hydroplane team.

Formula began introducing upgrades to graphics and upholstery in 2010 and later allowed customers to customize these upgrades. In 2012 Formula developed the Crossover Bowrider series and added outboard power in 2017.

Vic Porter passed away on October 24, 2021, at age 90 as Chairman Emeritus of Formula Boats. Five of Porter's six children continue to serve in upper management positions, and many grandchildren and great-grandchildren work full and part-time for the company. Formula celebrated 65 years in business in 2021.

Overview

Formula's main headquarters are in Decatur, Indiana, and manufactures 16 models of fast boats. Customers can choose from a range of power pleasure boat options, such as the Bowrider to the Performance Cruiser.

Formula Boats has won many construction and performance awards through its many years in business. In 2001 and 2002, Formula won the Mercury Constructor's Cup. The 370 Super Sport and the Formula 400 Super Sport won Powerboat Sport Cruiser of the Year in 2004 and 2005. In 2006, the Formula 240 Bowrider won Powerboat Magazine's "Boat of the Year."

Formula Boats are also renowned for their racing history. In 1985, Scott Porter raced the 302 SR-1 "Secret Formula" to win the Southeast Divisional Championship. Boats from the Formula catalog won the World Championships for the American Power Boat Association in 2003. A Formula-sponsored Unlimited Hydroplane won first place in the American Boat Racing Association's National High Points race in 2006.

FormulaFLEX

FormulaFlex by Formula Boats gives customers the chance to personalize the graphics, upholstery and electronics on their private boats. These changes are available without additional charges. If the customer desires options beyond Formula's offerings, FormulaFlex MyWay allows for further personalization options.

Flexibility in Customization

The FormulaFlex program allows customers to interchange all graphic colors and swap the colors on the hullside graphics. The Formula team paints graphic colors in-house in a process similar to professionally painted show cars by using an Axalata ChromaPremier base coat and an Imron Elite clear coat.

With the FormulaFlex program, customers can choose from more than 25 graphic choices across four lines of boats. Customers have more than 30 colors in the Formula Axalata Paint Library to choose from when personalizing Flagship colors, stripes or accent colors.

The Formula FlexMyWay program provides customers with more color options beyond theAxalata Paint Library. Customers can choose from any of the 1,341 solid colors from thePantone Matching System® or the thousands of colors available from automotive manufacturers.

Mix and Match Upholstery

The FormulaFlex Program allows for personalization opportunities inside and outside your boat. Customers can customize the upholstery base, accent and piping colors to create a unique look.

If customers wish to personalize their vessels further, the FormulaFlex MyWay program allows customers to customize the cockpit upholstery and cabin decorations. Customers can work with Formula's upholstery design specialist and choose from an extensive library of vinyl colors.

Customize the Electronics and Helm Layout

Customers can optimize their electronics layout and gauges on the dash panel to match their personal preferences with the FormulaFlex program. One of Formula's dash panel specialists will create a personalized layout which is then cut in-house on CNC routers after receiving customer approval. If a customer wants additional electronics options, a Formula electronics engineer will work with the customer to provide specific upgrades.

Dealers

Formula Boats has dealer locations around the world.

Current Models

Since its creation in 1962, Formula has created many different boat models. Their current catalog includes Bowrider, Crossover Bowrider, Super Sport Crossover, All Sport Crossover, Sun Sport and Performance Cruiser.

Bowrider

The Formula Bowrider uses high-quality materials and superior craftsmanship for innovative designs. These highly customizable boats are versatile and can entertain friends and accommodate family, whether by speeding across the water or gently cutting through the waves. Models of this boat include:

240 Bowrider
270 Bowrider
290 Bowrider
310 Bowrider

Crossover Bowrider

The Crossover Bowrider is a flexible vessel that can easily handle daytime activities or overnight trips. With multiple customization options, customers are sure to design a Crossover Bowrider unique to their preferences. Models of the Crossover Bowrider include:

330 Crossover Bowrider
350 Crossover Bowrider

Super Sport Crossover

The Super Sport Crossover combines wrap-around lounges and a large swim platform for a versatile and practical design. This sleek line is perfect for creating lasting memories with family and friends on the water. The Super Sport Crossover is available in models such as:

380 Super Sport Crossover
400 Super Sport Crossover
430 Super Sport Crossover
500 Super Sport Crossover

All Sport Crossover

Customers can enjoy a fusion of the versatility of a dayboat, the ability for overnight boating and accommodations for sport and adventure with the All Sport Crossover. At 43 feet in length with a 12-foot beam, the All Sport Crossover is comfortable and can withstand any adventure customers may encounter on the water. Models of the All Sport Crossover include:

430 All Sport Crossover

Sun Sport

The Sun Sport cruiser is a top-rated cuddy cabin boat that uses durable, high-quality materials. These cuddy cabin boats are fully customizable for a full day of fun in the sun. Sun Sport models include:

310 Sun Sport
350 Sun Sport

Performance Cruiser

With a spacious cabin and customizable features, customers and their families can enjoy many days on the water with a performance cruiser. The Performance Cruiser is available in the following models:

34 Performance Cruiser
37 Performance Cruiser
40 Performance Cruiser

References

Innovators in Boating - The Porter Family & Formula Boats (Part 1). Retrieved 2021-27-12
" Innovators in Boating - The Porter Family & Formula Boats (Part 2). Retrieved 2021-27-12

External links
Formula Boats website

American boat builders
Manufacturing companies based in Indiana
Vehicle manufacturing companies established in 1962